Francis Wilfred Simon (1899–1956) was an English footballer who played for Manchester City, Crewe Alexandra, and Port Vale.

Career
Simon played for Manchester City and Crewe Alexandra, before joining Port Vale in July 1920. He played three Second Division games in the 1920–21 season and then seven games in the 1921–22 season. He scored his first goal for the club on Christmas Eve 1921, in a 3–2 defeat to Barnsley at Oakwell. He was released from The Old Recreation Ground in the summer of 1922. Nicknamed Doffey, he served Winsford United for many seasons before captaining Nantwich to Cheshire Senior Cup success in 1933.

Honours
Nantwich
Cheshire Senior Cup: 1933

Statistics
Source:

References

1899 births
1956 deaths
Sportspeople from Crewe
English footballers
Association football midfielders
Manchester City F.C. players
Crewe Alexandra F.C. players
Port Vale F.C. players
Winsford United F.C. players
Nantwich Town F.C. players
English Football League players